HK Vukovi, previously HK Stari Grad, is an ice hockey club from Sarajevo, Bosnia and Herzegovina. The club was founded in 2002.

Season by season record
2009-2010

External links
Euro Hockey Team Profile
Team Roster

Ice hockey teams in Bosnia and Herzegovina
Sport in Sarajevo
2002 establishments in Bosnia and Herzegovina